Benett is a variant form of the surname Bennett, a medieval form of Benedict.

People with the name
Notable people with the surname include:

Etheldred Benett (1776–1835), English geologist
Léon Benett (1839–1917), French painter
Sarah Benett, (1850–1924), English suffragette
Vere Fane Benett-Stanford (1840–1894), English politician

Fictional characters
Claire Bennet, a fictional character in the NBC series Heroes

See also
Benet (disambiguation)
Bennet (disambiguation)
Bennett (disambiguation)
Benetti (disambiguation)

English-language surnames